The Mineral River is an  tributary of Lake Superior on the western Upper Peninsula of Michigan in the United States. The United States Board on Geographic Names settled on "Mineral River" as the stream's name in 1976; according to the Geographic Names Information System it has also been known historically as "Beaver Creek".

See also
List of Michigan rivers

References

Rivers of Michigan
Rivers of Ontonagon County, Michigan
Tributaries of Lake Superior